Dressed to Kill is the third studio album by American hard rock band Kiss, released on March 19, 1975. It was produced by Casablanca Records president Neil Bogart and the band itself as the label's financial situation at the time did not permit the hiring of a professional producer.

Album information
Possibly due to the short length of the album, original vinyl versions had long pauses between each track to make the sides longer than they would be based on the material they had. Each side ran just 15 minutes, and some of the song times were listed incorrectly on the vinyl versions. For example, "Two Timer" was listed at 2:59 and "Ladies in Waiting" was listed at 2:47.

While the album cover depicts Kiss in business suits, the only member of the band who owned one was Peter Criss. The suits worn on the cover by the rest of the band were owned by manager Bill Aucoin. The original vinyl release of the album also had the Kiss logo embossed around the picture. The photograph of the band on the album cover was taken on the southeast corner of W23rd Street and 8th Avenue looking east in New York City. A remastered edition of Dressed to Kill was released in 1997.

Reception

Dressed to Kill peaked at No. 32 on the Billboard 200 album chart in the US and was certified gold by the RIAA on February 28, 1977. "C'mon and Love Me" and "Rock and Roll All Nite" were released as singles but failed to rise up the charts. A live version of "Rock and Roll All Nite" from Alive!, issued as a single later that year, reached No. 12 on the Billboard Hot 100.

Hi-Fi for Pleasure said of the album:

"Rock and Roll All Nite" is one of Kiss' most well-known songs – and has remained a staple in the band's concerts since 1975 – along with "Rock Bottom", "C'mon and Love Me", and "She".

Track listing
All credits adapted from the original release.

Personnel
Kiss
Paul Stanley – vocals, rhythm guitar; intro guitar solo on "C'mon and Love Me"
Gene Simmons – vocals, bass; rhythm guitar on "Ladies in Waiting"
Peter Criss – drums, vocals
Ace Frehley – lead guitar, acoustic guitar, backing vocals; all guitars and bass on "Getaway" and "Rock Bottom"

Production
Neil Bogart – producer
Dave Wittman – engineer
George Lopez – assistant engineer
Allen Zentz – mastering
Bob Gruen – photography
Joseph M. Palmaccio – remastering

Charts

Certifications

Release history
Casablanca NBLP-7016 (March 19, 1975): First LP issue
Mercury 824 148-2 M-1 (July 1987): First CD issue
Mercury 314 532 3762 (July 15, 1997): Remastered CD
Mercury B0020146-01 (April 1, 2014): 180 gram vinyl LP, reissue

References

External links

Kiss (band) albums
1975 albums
Albums recorded at Electric Lady Studios
Casablanca Records albums
Albums produced by Neil Bogart